Stångby is a locality situated in Lund Municipality, Skåne County, Sweden with 1,218 inhabitants in 2010.

References 

Populated places in Skåne County
Populated places in Lund Municipality